Justin Clark (born October 17, 1988, Atlanta, Georgia) is an American soccer player who most recently played for Orlando City in USL Pro, the third tier of the American soccer pyramid.

Career

College and Professional
Clark attended Marist School in Georgia, winning a state championship in 2006. He then attended and played three years of college soccer at Rollins College, playing in 41 games and scoring 3 goals and becoming an All-American his senior year.

Clark played with Orlando City during the 2012 preseason, and played in almost every preseason game for the Lions, scoring one goal. He signed his first professional contract with Orlando City on April 4, 2012. He was released upon the conclusion of the 2014 season, a casualty of the club's transition to Major League Soccer.

References

External links
 Player Bio at Rollins College official website
 Orlando City player profile
 

1988 births
Living people
American soccer players
Orlando City SC (2010–2014) players
Soccer players from Georgia (U.S. state)
Association football defenders
USL Championship players